Bryant Andrew Johnson (born March 7, 1981) is a former American football wide receiver who played in the National Football League (NFL). He was drafted by the Arizona Cardinals 17th overall in the 2003 NFL Draft and also played for the San Francisco 49ers, Detroit Lions, and Houston Texans. He played college football at Penn State.

Early years
Johnson attended Baltimore City College high school, excelling at football, basketball, and track.  He was selected first-team all-state and the 1998 Baltimore Touchdown Club’s offensive player-of-the-year from the Knight's football team,  Johnson also anchored a winning relay team at the Penn Relays for the school's track team.

College career
Johnson was a star wide receiver for Penn State, starting his final two years.  He was the sixth player in PSU history to catch more than 100 career passes, and finished second all-time with 2,008 career receiving yards.

Johnson earned a Bachelor of Arts in sociology from Penn State University in 2005.

Professional career

Arizona Cardinals
Johnson played three years predominantly as the Cardinals' third option receiver, playing mainly out of the slot receiver role, due to Anquan Boldin and Larry Fitzgerald being higher on the depth chart.  His 35 catches in 2003 was the third most receptions for a rookie (his teammate Anquan Boldin had the most receptions for a rookie that year). In his 5-year career with the Cardinals he caught 210 passes for 2675 yards and 9 touchdowns.

Johnson scored the inaugural touchdown at University of Phoenix Stadium, a 5-yard reception from Kurt Warner in the Arizona Cardinals preseason game on August 12, 2006.

San Francisco 49ers
Johnson signed a one-year deal with the San Francisco 49ers on March 14, 2008. He had 45 receptions for 546 yards and three touchdowns the 2008 season, his fifth straight season with 40 or more receptions. In his tenure with the 49ers, he changed his jersey number from 80 to 82 in respect of retired 49ers WR Jerry Rice, whose jersey number 80 was retired in his honor.

Detroit Lions
On February 28, 2009 Johnson signed a 3-year $9 million deal with the Detroit Lions. He was released on July 28, 2011.

Houston Texans
Johnson signed with the Houston Texans on August 29, 2011.

He re-signed with the Texans on July 26, 2012. On August 27, he was released by the team.

NFL career statistics

References

External links
ESPN profile
Detroit Lions bio

1981 births
Living people
American football wide receivers
Houston Texans players
Arizona Cardinals players
San Francisco 49ers players
Detroit Lions players
Players of American football from Baltimore
Penn State Nittany Lions football players
Baltimore City College alumni